Yeung Kwong  (1926 – 16 May 2015) was a Hong Kong trade unionist and labour rights activist. He served as chairman of the Hong Kong Federation of Trade Unions (HKFTU) from 1962 to 1980 and as its president from 1980 to 1988. He played a leading role in the 1967 Hong Kong riots against British rule in Hong Kong.

Trade unionist career
Born in 1926, Yeung became a member of the Hong Kong Tramways Workers Union in 1948 and led strikes by Hong Kong Tramway's fare conductors the following year.

He served as chairman of the Hong Kong Federation of Trade Unions (FTU), the largest pro-Beijing labour union in Hong Kong, from 1962 to 1980, and then as its president between 1980 and 1988. From 1973 to 1987, he was a local deputy to the National People's Congress.

1967 riots
During the 1967 Hong Kong riots, which was inspired by the Cultural Revolution and escalated from a labour dispute at a plastic-flower factory in San Po Kong, Yeung served as director of the Committee of Hong Kong and Kowloon Compatriots from All Circles for Struggle Against British Hong Kong Persecution. Thousands were injured and 51 died, 15 of whom were killed in bombings planted by the leftists.

Grand Bauhinia Medal controversy
Nominated by the FTU, then Chief Executive Tung Chee-hwa awarded the Grand Bauhinia Medal, the highest honour in Hong Kong, to Yeung for his "outstanding contribution to the labour movement and labour welfare in Hong Kong and for his dedicated community service" in 2001.

The award ceremony was held on 13 October 2001, and controversy immediately rose after the announcement, with many people believing that Tung, who was seeking re-election at the time, was pandering to the FTU, which is an important bloc of vote in the unique Chief Executive election system in Hong Kong. Yeung had in 1996 and 2002 sat on the Election Committee that elected Tung as Chief Executive. Some critics asserted that Yeung was not suitable for the highest honour of the land. Critics argued the event was a symbolic gesture for approval of the 1967 riot. Criticisms also came from victims of the riots and officials responsible for putting down the unrest, but the government declined to say if Yeung's "contributions" included what he did during the protests.

"It is not a matter of who encouraged this kind of action [bomb attacks]. Oppression will result in popular revolt," Yeung responded, also replying that deaths and injuries were inevitable in the struggle when asked if he felt sorry for the victims.

Death
In the morning of 16 May 2015, Yeung died at the Prince of Wales Hospital in Sha Tin after he underwent a heart operation. Acting Chief Executive Carrie Lam sent her condolences to Yeung's family and praised him for his contributions to the labour movement. Chief Executive CY Leung, Secretary for Labour and Welfare Matthew Cheung and other senior officials including the Director of Beijing's Liaison Office Zhang Xiaoming attended the funeral on 14 June 2015.

Protesters gathered outside his funeral with banners in the memory of those who died at the hands of the leftists during the 1967 riots. Some brought champagne to celebrate his death, while others brought pineapples (a metaphor and Cantonese slang for bombs and grenades) and cursed him.

References

Citations

Sources 
 RTHK article on Yeung's involvement in 1967 riots
 Cheung Man Kwong's newspaper article
 Editorial in Taipei Times, 2001
 Hong Kong Hansard record on proceedings, 2001

Recipients of the Grand Bauhinia Medal
Cantonese people
1967 Hong Kong riots
Delegates to the 4th National People's Congress
Delegates to the 5th National People's Congress
Delegates to the 6th National People's Congress
Members of the 7th Chinese People's Political Consultative Conference
Hong Kong trade unionists
Date of birth missing
1926 births
2015 deaths
People imprisoned on charges of terrorism
Members of the Selection Committee of Hong Kong